The quantum algorithm for linear systems of equations, also called HHL algorithm, designed by Aram Harrow, Avinatan Hassidim, and Seth Lloyd, is a quantum algorithm published in 2008 for solving linear systems. The algorithm estimates the result of a scalar measurement on the solution vector to a given linear system of equations.

The algorithm is one of the main fundamental algorithms expected to provide a speedup over their classical counterparts, along with Shor's factoring algorithm, Grover's search algorithm, and the quantum fourier transform.

An implementation of the quantum algorithm for linear systems of equations was first demonstrated in 2013 by Cai et al., Barz et al. and Pan et al. in parallel. The demonstrations consisted of simple linear equations on specially designed quantum devices. The first demonstration of a general-purpose version of the algorithm appeared in 2018 in the work of Zhao et al.

Due to the prevalence of linear systems in virtually all areas of science and engineering, the quantum algorithm for linear systems of equations has the potential for widespread applicability.

Procedure 
The problem we are trying to solve is: given a  Hermitian matrix  and a unit vector , find the solution vector  satisfying . This algorithm assumes that the user is not interested in the values of  itself, but rather the result of applying some operator  onto x, .

First, the algorithm represents the vector  as a quantum state of the form:
 

The state of the system after this decomposition is approximately:

The linear mapping operation is not unitary and thus will require a number of repetitions as it has some probability of failing. After it succeeds, we uncomputed the  register and are left with a state proportional to:

 

where  is a quantum-mechanical representation of the desired solution vector x. To read out all components of x would require the procedure be repeated at least N times. However, it is often the case that one is not interested in  itself, but rather some expectation value of a linear operator M acting on x. By mapping M to a quantum-mechanical operator and performing the quantum measurement corresponding to M, we obtain an estimate of the expectation value . This allows for a wide variety of features of the vector x to be extracted including normalization, weights in different parts of the state space, and moments without actually computing all the values of the solution vector x.

Explanation of the algorithm

Initialization 
Firstly, the algorithm requires that the matrix  be Hermitian so that it can be converted into a unitary operator. In the case where  is not Hermitian, define 

As  is Hermitian, the algorithm can now be used to solve  to obtain .

Secondly, The algorithm requires an efficient procedure to prepare , the quantum representation of b. It is assumed that there exists some linear operator  that can take some arbitrary quantum state  to  efficiently or that this algorithm is a subroutine in a larger algorithm and is given  as input. Any error in the preparation of state  is ignored.

Finally, the algorithm assumes that the state  can be prepared efficiently. Where

 

for some large .

Hamiltonian simulation 
Hamiltonian simulation is used to transform the Hermitian matrix  into a unitary operator, which can then be applied at will. This is possible if A is s-sparse and efficiently row computable, meaning it has at most s nonzero entries per row and given a row index these entries can be computed in time O(s). Under these assumptions, quantum Hamiltonian simulation allows  to be simulated in time .

subroutine 
The key subroutine to the algorithm, denoted , is defined as follows and incorporates a phase estimation subroutine:

1. Prepare  on register C

2. Apply the conditional Hamiltonian evolution (sum)

3. Define .

4. Adjoin a three-dimensional register S in the state
 

5. Reverse steps 1–3, uncomputing any garbage produced along the way.

The phase estimation procedure in steps 1-3 allows for the estimation of eigenvalues of A up to error .

The ancilla register in step 4 is necessary to construct a final state with inverted eigenvalues corresponding to the diagonalized inverse of A.  In this register, the functions f, g, are called filter functions. Producing a state proportional to the inverse of A requires 'well' to be measured, after which the overall state of the system collapses to the desired state by the extended Born rule.

Main loop 

 

where

 

and

 

After each repetition,  is measured and will produce a value of 'nothing', 'well', or 'ill' as described above. This loop is repeated until  is measured, which occurs with a probability . Rather than repeating  times to minimize error, amplitude amplification is used to achieve the same error resilience using only  repetitions.

Scalar measurement 
After successfully measuring 'well' on  the system will be in a state proportional to:

 

Run time analysis

Classical efficiency 
The best classical algorithm which produces the actual solution vector  is Gaussian elimination, which runs in  time.

If A is s-sparse and positive semi-definite, then the Conjugate Gradient method can be used to find the solution vector , which can be found in  time by minimizing the quadratic function .

Quantum efficiency 

Optimality 
An important factor in the performance of the matrix inversion algorithm is the condition number , which represents the ratio of 's largest and smallest eigenvalues. As the condition number increases, the ease with which the solution vector can be found using gradient descent methods such as the conjugate gradient method decreases, as  becomes closer to a matrix which cannot be inverted and the solution vector becomes less stable.

If the run-time of the algorithm were made poly-logarithmic in  then problems solvable on n qubits could be solved in poly(n) time, causing the complexity class BQP to be equal to PSPACE.

Error analysis 
Performing the Hamiltonian simulation, which is the dominant source of error, is done by simulating . Assuming that  is s-sparse, this can be done with an error bounded by a constant , which will translate to the additive error achieved in the output state .

Experimental realization 
While there does not yet exist a quantum computer that can truly offer a speedup over a classical computer, implementation of a "proof of concept" remains an important milestone in the development of a new quantum algorithm. Demonstrating the quantum algorithm for linear systems of equations remained a challenge for years after its proposal until 2013 when it was demonstrated by Cai et al., Barz et al. and Pan et al. in parallel.

Cai et al. 
Published in Physical Review Letters 110, 230501 (2013), Cai et al. reported an experimental demonstration of the simplest meaningful instance of this algorithm, that is, solving  linear equations for various input vectors. The quantum circuit is optimized and compiled into a linear optical network with four photonic quantum bits (qubits) and four controlled logic gates, which is used to coherently implement every subroutine for this algorithm. For various input vectors, the quantum computer gives solutions for the linear equations with reasonably high precision, ranging from fidelities of 0.825 to 0.993.

Barz et al. 
On February 5, 2013,  Stefanie Barz and co-workers demonstrated the quantum algorithm for linear systems of equations on a photonic quantum computing architecture. This implementation used two consecutive entangling gates on the same pair of polarization-encoded qubits. Two separately controlled NOT gates were realized where the successful operation of the first was heralded by a measurement of two ancillary photons. Barz et al. found that the fidelity in the obtained output state ranged from 64.7% to 98.1% due to the influence of higher-order emissions from spontaneous parametric down-conversion.

Pan et al. 
On February 8, 2013, Pan et al. reported a proof-of-concept experimental demonstration of the quantum algorithm using a 4-qubit nuclear magnetic resonance quantum information processor. The implementation was tested using simple linear systems of only 2 variables. Across three experiments they obtain the solution vector with over 96% fidelity.

Wen et al. 
Another experimental demonstration using NMR for solving an 8*8 system was reported by Wen et al. in 2018 using the algorithm developed by Subaşı et al.

Applications 
Quantum computers are devices that harness quantum mechanics to perform computations in ways that classical computers cannot. For certain problems, quantum algorithms supply exponential speedups over their classical counterparts, the most famous example being Shor's factoring algorithm. Few such exponential speedups are known, and those that are (such as the use of quantum computers to simulate other quantum systems) have so far found limited use outside the domain of quantum mechanics. This algorithm provides an exponentially faster method of estimating features of the solution of a set of linear equations, which is a problem ubiquitous in science and engineering, both on its own and as a subroutine in more complex problems.

Electromagnetic scattering 
Clader et al. provided a preconditioned version of the linear systems algorithm that provided two advances. First, they demonstrated how a preconditioner could be included within the quantum algorithm. This expands the class of problems that can achieve the promised exponential speedup, since the scaling of HHL and the best classical algorithms are both polynomial in the condition number. The second advance was the demonstration of how to use HHL to solve for the radar cross-section of a complex shape. This was one of the first end to end examples of how to use HHL to solve a concrete problem exponentially faster than the best known classical algorithm.

Linear differential equation solving 
Dominic Berry proposed a new algorithm for solving linear time dependent differential equations as an extension of the quantum algorithm for solving linear systems of equations. Berry provides an efficient algorithm for solving the full-time evolution under sparse linear differential equations on a quantum computer.

Finite element method 
The Finite Element Method uses large systems of linear equations to find approximate solutions to various physical and mathematical models. Montanaro and Pallister demonstrate that the HHL algorithm, when applied to certain FEM problems, can achieve a polynomial quantum speedup. They suggest that an exponential speedup is not possible in problems with fixed dimensions, and for which the solution meets certain smoothness conditions.

Quantum speedups for the finite element method are higher for problems which include solutions with higher-order derivatives and large spatial dimensions. For example, problems in many-body dynamics require the solution of equations containing derivatives on orders scaling with the number of bodies, and some problems in computational finance, such as Black-Scholes models, require large spatial dimensions.

Least-squares fitting 
Wiebe et al. provide a new quantum algorithm to determine the quality of a least-squares fit in which a continuous function is used to approximate a set of discrete points by extending the quantum algorithm for linear systems of equations. As the number of discrete points increases, the time required to produce a least-squares fit using even a quantum computer running a quantum state tomography algorithm becomes very large. Wiebe et al. find that in many cases, their algorithm can efficiently find a concise approximation of the data points, eliminating the need for the higher-complexity tomography algorithm.

Machine learning and big data analysis 

Machine learning is the study of systems that can identify trends in data. Tasks in machine learning frequently involve manipulating and classifying a large volume of data in high-dimensional vector spaces. The runtime of classical machine learning algorithms is limited by a polynomial dependence on both the volume of data and the dimensions of the space. Quantum computers are capable of manipulating high-dimensional vectors using tensor product spaces and are thus the perfect platform for machine learning algorithms.

The quantum algorithm for linear systems of equations has been applied to a support vector machine, which is an optimized linear or non-linear binary classifier. A support vector machine can be used for supervised machine learning, in which  training set of already classified data is available, or unsupervised machine learning, in which all data given to the system is unclassified. Rebentrost et al. show that a quantum support vector machine can be used for big data classification and achieve an exponential speedup over classical computers.

In June 2018, Zhao et al. developed an algorithm for performing Bayesian training of deep neural networks in quantum computers with an exponential speedup over classical training due to the use of the quantum algorithm for linear systems of equations, providing also the first general-purpose implementation of the algorithm to be run in cloud-based quantum computers.

See also 
 Differentiable programming

References 

Quantum algorithms
Integer factorization algorithms
Articles containing proofs